Joseph Émile Macker, also Emile Macker (27 February 1828 – 3 December 1916) was a French entomologist specialising in Lepidoptera.

Émile Macker was a Doctor in Colmar.

Works
Partial list:
Catalogue des Lépidopteres d'Alsace avec indications des localités, de l'époque d'apparition et de quelques détails propres à en faciliter la recherche. I. Macrolépidopteres revue et coordonnée par M. le Dr. Macker. II. Microlépidoptères revue et coordonnée par M. l'Abbé Fettig.

References
Luquet, G. C. 2012: À propos des patronymes et des toponymes figurant sur les étiquettes de la collection de Lépidoptères de Jean Schlumberger - Éléments de biographie sur J. de Schlumberger (°1819–+1908) et sur quelques-uns de ses correspondants entomologistes. Alexanor : Revue française de Lépidoptérologie , Paris 25 (6), S. 3–159
Idref

French lepidopterists
1828 births
1916 deaths